Natalya Lebedeva (born 24 August 1949 in Moscow) is a retired Soviet athlete who competed mainly in the 100m hurdles.

She competed for the Soviet Union in the 1976 Summer Olympics held in Montreal, Canada in the 100 metre hurdles where she won the bronze medal.

References

Sports Reference

1949 births
Living people
Russian female hurdlers
Soviet female hurdlers
Olympic bronze medalists for the Soviet Union
Athletes (track and field) at the 1976 Summer Olympics
Olympic athletes of the Soviet Union
Medalists at the 1976 Summer Olympics
Olympic bronze medalists in athletics (track and field)
Universiade medalists in athletics (track and field)
Universiade bronze medalists for the Soviet Union
Medalists at the 1973 Summer Universiade
Medalists at the 1977 Summer Universiade